"Don't Know Much" is a song written by Barry Mann, Cynthia Weil and Tom Snow. Mann was the first to record the song in 1980, gaining a minor chart hit in the US. The song was made famous when it was covered as a duet by Linda Ronstadt and Aaron Neville in 1989. Their version was a worldwide success, topping the Irish Singles Chart and reaching the top 10 in several territories.

History
The song first appeared on Barry Mann's self-titled 1980 album, released on Casablanca records. Bill Medley scored a Billboard Hot 100 chart success with it rising to number 88 in April 1981. The next month, the song hit number 29 on the Adult Contemporary chart. Bette Midler recorded a version with changed lyrics under the title "All I Need to Know", charting at number 77 in 1983.

In 2000, Barry Mann re-recorded the song with Brenda Russell on his album Soul and Inspiration, released on Atlantic Records.

Bill Medley version

In 1981, American singer-songwriter Bill Medley covered the song for his eighth studio album Sweet Thunder. Medley's version was a minor hit, reaching Number 88 on the Billboard Hot 100 and Number 29 on the US Adult Contemporary chart.

Charts

Bette Midler version

In 1983, American actress and singer Bette Midler covered the song for her 1983 album No Frills under the title "All I Need to Know", with changed lyrics. Midler's version reached number 39 on the Billboard Hot Adult contemporary chart, number 77 on the Billboard Hot 100, and number 5 on the RPM Adult contemporary chart, having its highest peak there.

Charts

Linda Ronstadt and Aaron Neville version

The song was covered on Linda Ronstadt's triple-platinum 1989 album Cry Like a Rainstorm, Howl Like the Wind. It was introduced to Ronstadt and Neville by Steve Tyrell. Co-produced by Tyrell and Peter Asher, it was released as a single in the United States in 1989, peaking at number two on the Billboard Hot 100 and number one on the Hot Adult Contemporary Tracks chart. The single was Ronstadt's 10th and last top-10 hit and was certified Gold, eventually selling over 900,000 copies in the United States. In the United Kingdom, the song peaked at number two on the UK Singles Chart. The song also peaked at number one in Ireland, number two in Australia, and reached the top five in Austria, Belgium, Canada, the Netherlands, and New Zealand.

"Don't Know Much" won Ronstadt and Neville the 1990 Grammy Award for Best Pop Performance by a Duo or Group with Vocal and was nominated for Song of the Year.

Critical reception
"Don't Know Much" received favorable reviews from music critics. American magazine Billboard deemed it "a strong send-off" from the album. Swedish Expressen called it "heavenly", adding, "What a lovesong." Robin Katz from Music Week complimented it as a "brilliant insight into aging." Cary Darling from Orange County Register labeled it as a "soaring, wide-screen ballad." Jan DeKnock of Orlando Sentinel described it as "a killer ballad." A reviewer from People Magazine felt "their voices fuse like sunlight beaming through a stained-glass window." James Hunter of Rolling Stone praised it as "brilliant". Californian Santa Cruz Sentinel called it a "tender love ballad duet." Ken Tucker from Spin declared it as "a pretty Barry Mann-Cynthia Weil weeper."

Music video
In the accompanying music video for "Don't Know Much", both Neville and Ronstadt portray a middle-aged couple that are remembering their past and all the difficulties that they seem to have faced together.

Track listing

Charts

Weekly charts

Year-end charts

Certifications

References

1980 songs
1981 singles
1989 singles
Linda Ronstadt songs
Aaron Neville songs
Bill Medley songs
Bette Midler songs
Male–female vocal duets
Songs written by Tom Snow
Songs written by Barry Mann
Irish Singles Chart number-one singles
Songs with lyrics by Cynthia Weil
Elektra Records singles
Liberty Records singles
Atlantic Records singles
Song recordings produced by Peter Asher